Forward Kwenda is a mbira performer from Zimbabwe. He was born in the rural Buhera area in Manicaland, an area known for its fierce resistance to colonial rulers and respect for Shona tradition. As a young boy, Forward excelled in traditional dance and recitation of ancient poetry. At the age of 10, he began to play ngoma (drums) and hosho (gourd rattles) for his mother's gombwe (rain-making) spirit. He was given the name "Forward" because of his curiosity about many subjects, enthusiastic involvement in many activities and his performances for guerrilla forces during the Rhodesian Bush War.

At an early age, Forward borrowed a mbira and, with no teacher other than occasional radio programs, began to play on his own. In 1984, Kwenda moved to Zimbabwe's capital city of Harare and began to play mbira with other musicians. Within a year, he had formed his own mbira group and was making records and performing on national radio, as well as performing constantly at mapira ceremonies. During this period, he was informed by powerful rain-making spirits that he was to devote his life to playing mbira for their ceremonies. He was particularly known as a teenager for bringing the desired spirits to a ceremony by the end of the first song he played at a ceremony.

In 1985, Forward began playing in a unique complex style - much to the amazement of master mbira players two and three generations his senior. This style, considered in Shona culture to be "more ancient" because spirits prefer it, was first recorded in 1985 and 1986 by his American friend Glenn Makuna, who dubbed Kwenda "the Coltrane of mbira.". Hand-to-hand distribution of those cassettes, and others recorded later, has led to international acclaim for the virtuosity, soulfulness, and unprecedented range of melodic and rhythmic improvisation of Kwenda's playing. Meanwhile, he is in great demand in Zimbabwe, where the most ancient spirits, the makombwe, believed to be the ancestors of all mankind, prefer Kwenda's ancient style and come to earth as soon as he begins playing his mbira. Kwenda claims "It's not me, my spirits just play through me," and takes no credit whatsoever for his virtuosity.

Asked about his experience of playing mbira, Forward responds:

In 1997, Kwenda toured the United States with Erica Azim, and recorded the Shanachie CD Svikiro: Meditations of an Mbira Master. In 1999, a transcendent field recording of Kwenda on a Zimbabwean mountaintop at sunset. In February 2000, Kwenda performed at the Kennedy Center in Washington, DC with Erica Azim and  toured North America with her during 2000, 2001 and 2002.

In 2019 Forward Kwenda coauthored the book Learn to Play Mbira : Traditional Songs and Improvisation with author, Andy Fowler. On January 1, 2020, they launched the mbira master video and tablature archiving project mbira.online within which, Forward is the predominant tutor/performer. Forward and Andy now work together at Mbira Magic to 'promote mbira music and create employment for Zimbabwean musicians'.

See also
Mbira
Shona music
Zimbabwe

References

External links
Mbira Magic - Discover Mbira : Ancient Zimbabwean Trance Music
Mbira.Online - Mbira Masters Video and Notation/Tablature Archive
MBIRA - A non-profit in support of Shona music

People from Manicaland Province
Zimbabwean musicians
Living people
Year of birth missing (living people)